Banshee is a vertically scrolling shooter released for the Amiga 1200 and Amiga CD32 in 1994 by Core Design. The game was ranked the 39th best Amiga game of all time by Amiga Power in 1996.

References

External links
 Banshee at uvlist.net
 Banshee at the Amiga Hall of Light

1994 video games
Amiga games
Amiga 1200 games
Amiga-only games
Amiga CD32 games
Core Design games
Vertically scrolling shooters
Video games developed in the United Kingdom
Multiplayer and single-player video games